William Reid Owen (25 November 1864 – 22 March 1949) was the 20th mayor of Vancouver, British Columbia in 1924. He was born in Ontario and moved to Vancouver in 1899.

He became mayor after winning a narrow victory over Louis Taylor by 53 votes. He lost to Taylor the following year by 640 votes.

References

External links
Vancouver History: list of mayors, accessed 20 August 2006

1864 births
1949 deaths
Mayors of Vancouver
People from Ontario
20th-century Canadian politicians